Robert Carlson may refer to:

 Robert James Carlson (born 1944), American clergyman of the Roman Catholic Church
 Robert Carlson (sailor) (1905–1965), American sailor who competed in the 1932 Summer Olympics
 Robert S. Carlson, head college football coach for the University of Wichita, 1951–1952